Osek is a settlement in the Municipality of Sveta Trojica v Slovenskih Goricah in northeastern Slovenia. The area is part of the traditional region of Styria and is now included in the Drava Statistical Region.

Traces of a Roman period settlement, a quarry, and a burial ground have been identified and partly excavated near the settlement.

References

External links
Osek at Geopedia

Populated places in the Municipality of Sveta Trojica v Slovenskih Goricah